Syntagma (σύνταγμα), a Greek word meaning "arrangement" in classical Greek and "constitution" in modern Greek, may refer to:

The Constitution of Greece
Ottoman Empire Constitution of 1876
Syntagma Square in Athens
Syntagma station of the Athens Metro
A military unit of 256 men in the army of Macedon
Syntagma (linguistics), a linguistic term related to syntagmatic structure
a genetically encoded sensor to tag active synapses

Books
Syntagma, a lost work of Hippolytus
a 5th-century work by Gelasius of Cyzicus, ecclesiastical writer
a 6th-century work by Athanasios of Emesa, Byzantine jurist
a 9th-century medical work by Theodosius Romanus, Syriac Orthodox patriarch of Antioch
a 12th-century religious work by Theodore Balsamon, Greek Orthodox patriarch of Antioch
a 14th-century religious work by Matthew Blastares, Byzantine writer
Syntagma Canonum, a 14th-century law compendium
Syntagma Musicum, a 17th-century work of organology by Michael Praetorius
Syntagma Anatomicum, a 17th-century text book for medical students by Johann Vesling